Eureka County is a county in the U.S. state of Nevada. As of the 2020 census, the population was 1,855, making it the second-least populous county in Nevada. Its county seat is Eureka.

Eureka County is part of the Elko Micropolitan Statistical Area.

History
The new mining camp's residents complained Austin was too far to go for county business and a new county was created. It was named for the ancient Greek term, Eureka, meaning, "I have found it." This term was used earlier in California and other locations. Eureka has always been the county seat.

Geography

The county's highest point is the 10,631 ft (3240 m) summit of Diamond Peak in the Diamond Mountains along the border with White Pine County.

Adjacent counties
Elko County - northeast
White Pine County - east
Nye County - south
Lander County - west

National protected area
Humboldt-Toiyabe National Forest (part)

Major highways
 Interstate 80
 U.S. Route 50
 State Route 278
 State Route 306
 State Route 766
 State Route 781

Demographics

2000 census
At the 2000 census there were 1,651 people, 666 households, and 440 families living in the county. The population density was 0.39 people per square mile (0.15/km2).  There were 1,025 housing units at an average density of 0.25 per square mile (0.09/km2).
Of the 666 households 33.00% had children under the age of 18 living with them, 56.50% were married couples living together, 5.00% had a female householder with no husband present, and 33.90% were non-families. 29.10% of households were one person and 9.90% were one person aged 65 or older. The average household size was 2.47 and the average family size was 3.08.

The age distribution was 27.80% under the age of 18, 5.20% from 18 to 24, 28.60% from 25 to 44, 25.90% from 45 to 64, and 12.40% 65 or older. The median age was 38 years. For every 100 females, there were 106.60 males. For every 100 females age 18 and over, there were 113.20 males.

The county's median household income was $41,417, and the median family income was $49,438. Males had a median income of $45,167 versus $25,000 for females. The county's per capita income was $18,629. 12.60% of the population and 8.90% of families were below the poverty line. Out of the people living in poverty, 11.70% are under the age of 18 and 16.40% are 65 or older.

2010 census
At the 2010 census, there were 1,987 people, 836 households, and 495 families living in the county. The racial makeup of the county was 89.3% white, 2.4% American Indian, 0.9% Asian, 0.1% black or African American, 5.1% from other races, and 2.2% from two or more races. Those of Hispanic or Latino origin made up 12.0% of the population. In terms of ancestry, 43.3% were American, 14.8% were German, 11.4% were Irish, 7.3% were English, and 6.9% were Italian.

Of the 836 households, 27.3% had children under the age of 18 living with them, 51.6% were married couples living together, 4.2% had a female householder with no husband present, 40.8% were non-families, and 33.0% of households were made up of individuals. The average household size was 2.38 and the average family size was 3.07. The median age was 42.4 years.

The median household income was $61,400 and the median family income  was $75,179. Males had a median income of $54,625 versus $42,321 for females. The per capita income for the county was $30,306. About 9.9% of families and 16.2% of the population were below the poverty line, including 23.6% of those under age 18 and 13.9% of those age 65 or over.

Communities
There are no incorporated places in Eureka County.

Census-designated places
Crescent Valley
Eureka (county seat)

Unincorporated communities
Beowawe
Palisade
Primeaux

Ghost towns
Alpha
Ruby Hill

Education
Eureka County School District is the county school district.

Politics

Background

Eureka County is heavily Republican. This does not, however, have a large effect on elections in the state due to the fact that the majority of Nevada's population live in Clark County and Washoe County.

Summary Of Political Climate

Eureka County is strongly Republican; the last time they voted for a Democratic candidate was in 1964, and the last time a Democratic candidate recorded a quarter of the county's vote was in 1988. The last time a Republican candidate failed to receive a majority of the county's vote was in 1992, when the vote was somewhat split when independent candidate Ross Perot recorded approximately a third of the county's vote.

In 2016, Democratic candidate Hillary Clinton received only 8.67% of the vote. In 2020, Donald Trump received nearly 90% of the vote in Eureka County, despite his statewide defeat in Nevada.

See also

National Register of Historic Places listings in Eureka County, Nevada
Jessie Callahan Mahoney - Eureka country commissioner

References

External links
 
 Eureka Branch Library

 
1873 establishments in Nevada
Elko, Nevada micropolitan area
Populated places established in 1873